Joe Connelly may refer to:
 Joe Connelly (musician) (born 1965), barbershop quartet lead singer
 Joe Connelly (producer) (1917–2003), Hollywood film and television producer, director and writer
 Joe Connelly (writer), New York City contemporary writer

See also
 Joe Connolly (disambiguation)